Natalya Vladimirovna Linichuk (born 6 February 1956) is a Russian ice dancing coach and former competitive ice dancer for the Soviet Union. With partner and husband Gennadi Karponosov, she is the 1980 Olympic champion and a two-time World champion.

Competitive career
Linichuk began skating due to her mother who enjoyed figure skating. She had a dozen coaches before ending up in the group of Elena Tchaikovskaia, who Linichuk soon sensed was the right coach for her.

Linichuk and Karponosov trained at Dynamo in Moscow. They won the World Universiade in 1972, and were bronze medalists at the 1974 and 1977 World Championships. They also finished 4th at the 1976 Winter Olympics, the year ice dancing was introduced as an Olympic sport. 

Linichuk and Karponosov became World champions in 1978 and 1979. They won the European Championships in 1979 and 1980, after winning a silver medal in 1978, and bronze medals from 1974 through 1977. 

Linichuk and Karponosov won the 1980 Olympics, but failed to defend their World title, making them the only team ever to unsuccessfully defend a World title after winning the Olympics. In 1981, Linichuk and Karponosov retired from competition.

Coaching career 

After coaching in Moscow, Linichuk and Karponosov accepted an offer to coach in the U.S. They moved with their students in June 1994 and coached at the University of Delaware in Newark, Delaware. In September 2007, they moved to the Ice Works Skating Complex in Aston, Pennsylvania.

Their current and former senior-level students include:
 Tanith Belbin / Benjamin Agosto (coached from mid-2008 to 2010). 2009 World silver medalists for the U.S.
 Galit Chait / Sergei Sakhnovsky (World bronze medalists)
 Albena Denkova / Maxim Staviski (coached from mid-2005 to 2007). 2006, 2007 World Champions for Bulgaria.
 Oksana Domnina / Maxim Shabalin (coached from mid-2008 to 2010). 2010 Olympic bronze medalists for Russia.
 Oksana Grishuk / Evgeni Platov (Olympic and World champions). Coached Grishuk from the age of 11 until 1989 and then from 1992 to 1996.
 Natalia Gudina / Alexei Beletski
 Anjelika Krylova / Vladimir Fedorov (World bronze medalists)
 Anjelika Krylova / Oleg Ovsyannikov (World champions, Olympic silver medalists)
 Irina Lobacheva / Ilia Averbukh (World champions, Olympic silver medalists)

Their current and former junior-level students include:
 Lauri Bonacorsi / Travis Mager (from May 2010) 2011 U.S. Junior silver medalists 
 Ekaterina Pushkash and Jonathan Guerreiro (coached from mid-2010 to 2014). 2011 World Junior silver medalists for Russia.

Personal life 
Linichuk accepted Karponosov's proposal after they retired from competition. She had one prior marriage. Linichuk and Karponosov were married on 31 July 1981. Their very talented daughter, Anastasiya Karponosova, was born in February 1985. The couple initially lived in Moscow and then moved to the United States in the early '90s.

Competitive highlights

References

External links 

Picture of Linichuk and Karponosov, 1979-1980 season
Picture of Linichuk with students Margaglio and Mezzadri
 Care to Ice Dance? - Linichuk & Karponosov

Navigation 

1956 births
Living people
Figure skaters from Moscow
Soviet female ice dancers
Russian female ice dancers
Dynamo sports society athletes
Olympic figure skaters of the Soviet Union
Figure skaters at the 1976 Winter Olympics
Figure skaters at the 1980 Winter Olympics
Olympic gold medalists for the Soviet Union
Russian figure skating coaches
Olympic medalists in figure skating
World Figure Skating Championships medalists
European Figure Skating Championships medalists
Female sports coaches
Medalists at the 1980 Winter Olympics